Protection is a city in Comanche County, Kansas, United States.  As of the 2020 census, the population of the city was 498.

History
Protection was founded in 1884. Popular support for a protective tariff in the 1884 presidential election caused the name to be selected.  The first post office in Protection was established on August 27, 1884.

The town became nationally and internationally known via radio and television in 1957, when the National Polio Foundation chose it as the center for the free distribution of Salk vaccine shots for polio. It then became 100 percent protected.

Geography
Protection is located at  (37.201316, -99.483403).

Demographics

2010 census
As of the census of 2010, there were 514 people, 215 households, and 131 families residing in the city. The racial makeup of the city was 95.3% White, 0.4% Native American, 0.6% Asian, 2.5% from other races, and 1.2% from two or more races. Hispanic or Latino of any race were 5.1% of the population.

There were 215 households, of which 25.6% had children under the age of 18 living with them, 54.0% were married couples living together, 4.7% had a female householder with no husband present, 2.3% had a male householder with no wife present, and 39.1% were non-families. 36.3% of all households were made up of individuals, and 20.5% had someone living alone who was 65 years of age or older. The average household size was 2.20 and the average family size was 2.86.

The median age in the city was 46.6 years. 21.6% of residents were under the age of 18; 3.5% were between the ages of 18 and 24; 22.1% were from 25 to 44; 25.1% were from 45 to 64; and 27.6% were 65 years of age or older. The gender makeup of the city was 48.4% male and 51.6% female.

2000 census
As of the census of 2000, there were 558 people, 241 households, and 152 families residing in the city. The racial makeup of the city was 96.95% White, 0.18% Asian, 1.79% from other races, and 1.08% from two or more races. Hispanic or Latino of any race were 2.69% of the population.

There were 241 households, out of which 23.7% had children under the age of 18 living with them, 51.9% were married couples living together, 7.1% had a female householder with no husband present, and 36.9% were non-families. 35.3% of all households were made up of individuals, and 21.6% had someone living alone who was 65 years of age or older. The average household size was 2.15 and the average family size was 2.67.

In the city, the population was spread out, with 20.1% under the age of 18, 4.3% from 18 to 24, 19.5% from 25 to 44, 26.2% from 45 to 64, and 29.9% who were 65 years of age or older. The median age was 50 years. For every 100 females, there were 103.6 males. For every 100 females age 18 and over, there were 85.1 males.

The median income for a household in the city was $26,917, and the median income for a family was $36,705. Males had a median income of $26,071 versus $15,682 for females. The per capita income for the city was $16,973. About 8.2% of families and 13.5% of the population were below the poverty line, including 13.6% of those under age 18 and 7.0% of those age 65 or over.

Education

The community is served by Comanche County USD 300 public school district.  South Central Elementary and South Central Middle School are in Protection, with the former Protection High School building on campus, while South Central High School is in Coldwater.  The South Central High School mascot is Timberwolves.

Prior to school unification, the Protection Panthers won the Kansas State High School 1A football championship in 1978 and the 8-Man DII football championship in 1983.

Notable People
 Stan Herd, crop artist
 Nathan Leeper, Olympic high jumper

References

Further reading

External links

 Protection - Directory of Public Officials
 History of Protection
 Maps: Protection city map, Comanche County map.

Cities in Kansas
Cities in Comanche County, Kansas